The armed miner bee (Andrena perarmata) is a species of miner bee in the family Andrenidae. Another common name for this species is the well-armed andrena. It is found in North America.

References

Further reading

 

perarmata